Jérôme Naulais (born 1951) is a French trombonist and composer.

Life 
Born in 1951 into a family of musicians, he began studying music at the age of six.

He obtained his first prizes of violin and double bass at the Conservatoire National de Boulogne-Billancourt before starting the study of the trombone and obtaining the first medal of solfège (1970) and a first prize for trombone (1971) at the Conservatoire de Paris.

First soloist with the Orchestre national d'Île-de-France (from 1974 to 1976) and the Concerts Colonne (from 1975 to 1982), he has been, since its creation in 1976, soloist of the Ensemble intercontemporain directed by Pierre Boulez.

He devotes a significant part of his activity to teaching. After having taught trombone at the music schools of Antony, Fresnes, Sèvres and the École Nationale de Musique de Ville-d'Avray as well as in international academies (France, Belgium, Japan), he is now Director of the École de Musique du Club Musical de la Poste de Paris of which he was also the director of the concert band. He was also director of the Music School of Bonneuil-sur-Marne from 1980 to 1998.

He has participated in numerous studio and concert recordings with major international variety stars as a trombonist and arranger. (Charles Aznavour, Harry Belafonte, Marlène Dietrich, Gilbert Bécaud, Shirley Bassey, etc.).

Very early on, he moved into composition by writing works for chamber music, concert bands and symphony orchestras. Some of his works have been presented in Japan, USA, Canada and various European countries.

For his sixtieth anniversary, the Éditions Marc Reift (EMR) produced 7 CDs in 2011 dedicated to the work of Jérôme Naulais (Jérôme Naulais Portrait Volume 1 to 7 with the Philharmonic Wind Orchestra, the Marc Reift Orchestra, le Fun & Easy Band and the Prague Festival Orchestra directed by ). A series bearing his name has also been published and includes more than 500 titles.

Compositions

Works for orchestra 
 1999: Le vent des helices, for five trumpets and orchestra
 Dany boy, for string orchestra
 Divertimento Nº1, for string orchestra
 Donna, Donna, for orchestra
 Latitudes, for orchestra
 Salvador de Bahia, for string orchestra

Works for wind band, fanfare orchestra or brass band 
 1992: Amuse gueule, for wind orchestra
 1992: Firerock, for wind orchestra
 1994: Face à face, for wind quintet solo and wind orchestra.
 1995: Caminos, for wind orchestra (with Alain Bodenes).
 1995: Saxtory, for saxophone quartet and wind orchestra.
 1997: Canta me la, for youth harmony orchestra
 1999: Agitations, for wind orchestra
 1999: Incandescens, for wind orchestra
 1999: Le vent des helices, for five trumpets and wind orchestra
 2002: Comic band, for wind orchestra
 2002: La Galerie Mysterieuse, for wind orchestra
 2002: Le Vent d'Autan, for wind orchestra
 2002: Más alla del sol, for wind orchestra
 2003: Engrenages, for large brass ensemble and percussion
 2003: Parfum de Paris, for wind orchestra
 2003: Russian Festival, for wind orchestra
 2003: Tony, for bugle solo and wind orchestra
 2003: Voyage au Japon, for wind orchestra
 2004: Le vent d'autan, for wind orchestra
 2005: Arcane I, for euphonium solo and wind orchestra
 2007: La grande muraille, for wind band or fanfare orchestra
 2007: La soupe aux choux, for wind orchestra
 2008: Da Vinci Code, for wind orchestra
 2009: Double Jeu, for trombone solo and wind band or fanfare orchestra
 2009: Jeux Interdits, for guitar and wind band or fanfare orchestra also for piano and brass band
 2009: Love Train, for wind orchestra
 2009: Montmartre, for wind orchestra and strings
 2009: Scotland the Brave, for wind orchestra
 4 Fanfares, for wind band or fanfare orchestra
 À la belle époque, for trumpet and wind orchestra
 À la croisée des chemins, for fanfare orchestra
 Alma Latina, for wind orchestra
 Amor y Sol, for wind band or fanfare orchestra
 Anche ou démon, for wind band or fanfare orchestra
 Attention à la marche, for wind orchestra
 Bagatelles, for wind orchestra
 Canicule, for trumpet solo and wind orchestra
 Cap Tonic, for wind orchestra
 Celtic festival, for wind orchestra
 Chocs, for 4 percussionists solo and wind orchestra
 Circus Marche, for wind band or fanfare orchestra
 Conversations, for wind orchestra
 Ragtime
 Ballade
 Animando
 Cool paradise, for wind orchestra
 Danny boy, for youth harmony orchestra
 Dans un tourbillon d'eau perlée, for wind orchestra
 Downtown, for wind band or fanfare orchestra
 Embuscade, for wind orchestra
 Émotions, for wind orchestra
 Envol vers l'infini, for wind orchestra
 Étoile des profondeurs, for trombone and wind orchestra
 Allegro
 Ballade
 Final Allegro
 Évasion, for trumpet solo and wind band or fanfare orchestra
 Fantaisie Hongroise, for transverse flute, clarinet solo and wind orchestra
 Flamme and Co, for wind band or fanfare orchestra
 Flash-Opening, for wind orchestra
 Frissons, for alto saxophone solo and wind orchestra
 Histoire d'airs, for wind orchestra
 Hurricane, for wind orchestra
 Incandescens, for wind orchestra
 Intrigues, for wind orchestra
 Irish Story, for wind or fanfare orchestra with strings
 Jardin secret, for wind orchestra
 Key West, for solo instrument (transverse flute, oboe, clarinet, soprano/alto saxophone, trumpet or violin) and wind orchestra
 L'Âme de Notre Harmonie, for mixed choir and wind orchestra
 La Conquistadora, for wind orchestra
 La Cueva del Dragón, for bass trombone solo and wind orchestra
 Latitudes, for trombone and wind orchestra
 Le temps des cathédrales, for wind orchestra
 Long beach, for wind orchestra
 Lost Dream, for wind orchestra
 Lyrical Overture, for wind orchestra
 Made in brass, for brass quintet solo and wind orchestra
 Magie Noire, for wind orchestra
 Niagara Falls, for wind orchestra
 Oh happy day, for wind orchestra
 Olas de amor, for trumpet solo and wind orchestra
 Original Circus, for wind orchestra
 Piña Colada, for wind orchestra
 Pulsions, for 13 brass players and 4 percussionists
 Rock Number One, for wind orchestra
 Russian Overture, for wind orchestra
 Sax de voyage, for soprano saxophone (or tenor saxophone) and wind orchestra
 Sentimental Bossa, for wind orchestra
 Skyline, voor harmonie- of fanfareorkest of brassband
 Turbulences, for wind orchestra
 Une comédie slave, for wind orchestra
 Val Rock, for wind orchestra
 Valsissimo, for four bassoons and wind orchestra
 Vaya Chicos, for wind band, fanfare orchestra or brass band
 Vent d'Est, for wind band or fanfare orchestra
 Vibrations, for wind orchestra
 Vienna By Night, for wind orchestra
 Why not?, for wind orchestra

Vocal music

Works for choir 
 La machine (en location), for voice and mixed choir

Chamber music 
 1984 Labyrinthe, for seven brass players (2 trumpets, 2 horns, 2 trombones, tuba) and percussion
 1988 Cocktail, for trumpet ensemble
 1988 Patchwork, for saxophone quartet
 1989 Images, for seven brass players and 3 percussionists
 1989 Mise à Sax, for saxophone quintet t
 1992 L'homme aux 3 visages, for nine horns, trombone solo; transverse flute; 2 oboes; 2 clarinets; 2 bassoons and horn in F)
 2002 Alma Latina, for transverse flute and piano
 12 petites pièces variés, for euphonium and tuba
 A fa feutrés, for trombone and piano
 Arthur, for trompet and piano
 Au fond des bois, for euphonium and tuba
 Au Tyrol, for clarinet and piano
 Audrey... de ma blonde, for trombone and piano
 Basse température, for double bass and piano
 Blanches d'hautbois, for oboe and piano
 Brisamar, for cello and piano
 Brumes, for horn and piano
 Caprichos, for transverse flute and piano
 Ce Matin-la, for alto saxophone and piano
 Ce soir là, for cello and piano
 Conte d'antan, for clarinet and piano
 Cool trombone, album for trombone and piano
 Couleur du temps, for violin and piano
 Daminou, for trumpet and piano
 Dérapages, for four trombones and marimba
 Destination, for flute ensemble (with Alain Bodenes)
 Deux si deux la, for transverse flute and piano
 Douze duos variés, for two clarinets
 Échappée clandestine, for violin and piano
 Écrin de rosée, for alto saxophone and piano
 Empreintes, for trombone and piano
 En quête du temps perdu, for clarinet and piano
 En revenant de Nohant, for transverse flute and piano
 Escapades, for trumpet ensemble (10 trumpeters).
 Filés de sol, for violin and piano
 Fulgurans, for trumpet ensemble
 Gentleman charmeur, for tuba and piano
 Grave décision, for double bass and piano
 Heureux comme un basson sur l'eau, for bassoon and piano
 Hier et aujourd'hui, for trombone and piano
 Influences, for 2 trumpets, 2 horns, 2 trombones and tuba
 Irish Coffee, for clarinet and piano
 Jazz Suite, version for 2 trumpets, 2 horns, 2 trombones tuba and percussion
 Jeu Totem, for horn and piano
 Juste un rêve, for violin and piano
 La Basse du roi, for double bass and piano
 La Cabane d'Hippolyte, for cello and piano
 La Canne de Provence, for clarinet and piano
 La Corde rêve, for double bass and piano
 La fille des sables, for alto saxophone and piano
 La petite sirène, for transverse flute and piano
 La Place Rouge, for trumpet and piano
 La Toupie, for xylophone and piano
 La-Mi calmant, for viola and piano
 Lady Pily, for clarinet and piano
 Latin District, for 6 trombones and 2 bass trombones
 L'Étrange Napolitaine, for trombone and piano
 Le Baladin, for horn and piano
 Le Jardin sur la lagune, for horn and piano
 Le Piège de Calpe, for trombone and piano
 Le tabou'ré, for bassoon and piano
 Les Balanciers, for horn and piano
 Les Humeurs de Pierrot, for transverse flute and piano
 Let's Bone March, for 7 trombones
 Ma première romance, for violin and piano
 Marie-Caramel, for alto or tenor saxophone and piano
 Menu à la quarte, for trombone and piano
 Message secret, for clarinet and piano
 Nara, for transverse flute and piano
 Natalina, for clarinet and piano
 Neige sur la Forêt Noire, for clarinet and piano
 Noctavia, for bassoon and piano
 Nuit Cosaque, for trombone and piano
 Oasis, for clarinet and pinao
 Obsessions 6, for 5 brass players and 4 percussionists
 One Bone Show, for trombone and piano
 Opéracor, for horn and piano
 Pain d'épice, for alto or tenor saxophone and piano
 Paseando, for trombone and piano
 Pastel, for trombone and piano
 Petit navire, for viola and piano
 Petit Train, for trumpet (or clarinet) and piano
 Petite Suite Latine, for alto saxophone and piano
 Petites ondes, for alto saxophone and piano
 Popbone, for trombone and piano
 Premier regard, for clarinet and piano
 Prise de bec, for clarinet and piano
 Promenade lyonnaise, for trumpet and piano
 P'tit Jules, for trumpet and piano
 Quatre à quatre, for trombone and piano
 Regard dore, for trumpet and piano
 Rock à Charnay, for trumpet and piano
 Safari, for trombone and piano
 Sax symbole, for alto saxophone and piano
 Sax trotter, for saxophone and piano
 Soirée d'été, for violin and piano
 Souviens toi, for oboe and piano
 Steph et Lisa, for alto saxophone and piano
 Sur le chemin du clair matin, for transverse flute and piano
 Sur le ton de la confidence, for vioa and piano
 Tapas nocturnes, for alto saxophone and piano
 Toquades, for clarinet quartet and drum kit.
 Triangle Austral, for 8 brass players and percussion
 Un instant d'égarement, for trumpet and piano
 Un jour à Saint Flour, for trombone and piano
 Un matin de Printemps, for trumpet and piano
 Va-et-vient, for percussion and piano
 Vacances aux Antilles, for trombone and piano
 Vacances en Bourgogne, for alto or tenor saxophone and piano
 Vertiges, for brass quintet.
 Via Mexico, for trumpet and piano
 Zazou dans le tortillard, for trumpet and piano
 Zoom, for brass quintet

Works for piano 
 12 recreations pour jeunes pianistes
 Au Pays Celte
 Aventure Nocturne
 Manolo
 Nino
 Nostalgia
 Petit Démon
 Rêverie d'un soir
 Sahara
 Scotty

References

External links 
 Jérôme Naulais on Naxos Records
 

1951 births
20th-century classical trombonists
20th-century French composers
20th-century French male musicians
21st-century classical trombonists
21st-century French composers
21st-century French male musicians
Concert band composers
Conservatoire de Paris alumni
French classical composers
French classical trombonists
French male classical composers
French music educators
Living people
Male trombonists
Place of birth missing (living people)